The Evaporators is a Canadian garage rock band formed in 1986 in Vancouver, British Columbia. Nardwuar, its founding member, is also known for interviewing musicians and celebrities. As of 2007, the band consists of vocalist/keyboardist Nardwuar the Human Serviette, guitarist David Carswell, bassist John Collins, and drummer Scott Livingstone.

History
As well as recording and performing as a separate group, The Evaporators often collaborate with other musicians, including Rodney Graham and Andrew W.K.  John Collins is a member of the band The New Pornographers and David Carswell is in The Smugglers.

The band members also perform as Thee Goblins and sometimes under other names. Lisa Marr, formerly of Cub, was also formerly a member of The Evaporators.

By 2008, the band had released four albums. The Evaporators were featured on a compilation album, Busy Doing Nothing, in 2013, and in 2016 the band released an album Ogopogo Punk. Most of their releases have been available on compact disc, vinyl, and 8-track.

Members

Stephen Hamm
David Carswell
Scott Livingstone
Nardwuar
Nick Thomas
Lisa Marr  (former)

Discography

Singles
 "Welcome to My Castle" (1992)
 "I'm Going to France!" (1993)
 "Honk the Horn" (2001)
 "A Wild Pear" (Split 7" with Andrew W.K.) (2009)

Albums
 I'm Going to France! (1994) Tosk Worldwide 8-tracks
 United Empire Loyalists (1996)
 I Gotta Rash/We Are Thee Goblins (1998)
 Ripple Rock (2004)
 Gassy Jack & Other Tales (2007)
 Busy Doing Nothing (2012)
 Ogopogo Punk (2016)

Compilations
 Canadian Relics EP with the song "Coho? Coho!" (1995)

See also

Music of Canada
Music of Vancouver
Canadian rock
List of Canadian musicians
List of bands from Canada
List of bands from British Columbia

References

External links
 Official site 

Musical groups established in 1986
Canadian indie rock groups
Canadian punk rock groups
Musical groups from Vancouver
Musical collectives
Mint Records artists
Alternative Tentacles artists
1986 establishments in British Columbia